The 2016 Patriot League women's basketball tournament was held March 5, 7, 11 and 12 at campus sites of the higher seed. Army defeated Loyola (MD) to win their 3rd Patriot League title and earn an automatic trip to the NCAA women's tournament.

Seeds
Teams are seeded by conference record, with ties broken in the following order:
 Head-to-head record between the teams involved in the tie
 Record against the highest-seeded team not involved in the tie, going down through the seedings as necessary
 Higher RPI entering the tournament, as published by College Basketball News

Schedule

Bracket

References

Tournament
Patriot League women's basketball tournament